The 1987 NCAA Division I Men's Swimming and Diving Championships were contested in March 1987 at the Texas Swimming Center at the University of Texas in Austin, Texas at the 64th annual NCAA-sanctioned swim meet to determine the team and individual national champions of Division I men's collegiate swimming and diving in the United States. The men's and women's titles would not be held at the same site until 2006.

Stanford once again topped the team standings, the Cardinal's third consecutive and fourth overall men's title.

Team standings
Note: Top 10 only
(H) = Hosts
(DC) = Defending champions
Full results

See also
List of college swimming and diving teams

References

NCAA Division I Men's Swimming and Diving Championships
NCAA Division I Men's Swimming And Diving Championships
NCAA Division I Men's Swimming And Diving Championships
NCAA Division I Men's Swimming and Diving Championships